PalaRuffini, formerly known as Palasport di Torino, is a multi-purpose Indoor arena located in Turin, Italy. It is primarily used for basketball and volleyball games, as well as boxing matches and concerts. The arena's seating capacity is 4,500 people.

History
The arena was opened in 1961. Dalida had a sold-out concert in October 1970 as a part of her world tour. It hosted the latter stages of the EuroBasket 1979. It also hosted the 1992–93 season's FIBA European Cup final, in which Sato Aris defeated Efes Pilsen, by a score of 50–48.

The arena was renovated in the year 2004. On 17 September 2008, the senior men's Italian national basketball team played a 2009 EuroBasket qualification game against Bulgaria, at the arena. The arena has also been used as the long-time home arena of the Italian professional basketball club Auxilium Pallacanestro Torino.

See also
List of indoor arenas in Italy

References

External links

Image 1 of PalaRuffini Interior
Image 2 of PalaRuffini Interior

Basketball venues in Italy
Indoor arenas in Italy
Sport in Turin
Volleyball venues in Italy
Pier Luigi Nervi buildings